Ralf Seekatz (born 9 May 1967) is a German politician of the Christian Democratic Union (CDU) who has been serving as a Member of the European Parliament since 2019.

Political career
From 2006 to 2019 Seekatz was as a member of the Landtag of Rhineland-Palatinate, where he served on the Committee on Internal Affairs and as a full member of the Committee on European Affairs. He was also his parliamentary group's spokesperson on European affairs.

On the local level, Seekatz served as mayor of Westerburg from 2007 until 2019.

Seekatz has been a Member of the European Parliament since the 2019 European elections. He has since been serving on the Committee on Civil Liberties, Justice and Home Affairs. In addition to his committee assignments, he is part of the Parliament's delegation for relations with India.

References

External links

Living people
MEPs for Germany 2019–2024
Christian Democratic Union of Germany MEPs
1967 births